Charlottenlund station is a commuter station serving the suburb of Charlottenlund north of Copenhagen, Denmark, as well as the nearby Charlottenlund Beach Park and the Charlottenlund Racetrack.

Charlottenlund station is located on the Klampenborg radial of Copenhagen's S-train network and regularly served by trains on the C-line or F-line.

History 

Charlottenlund Station opened on 22 July 1863 with the opening of the Klampenborg Line, and was named after the nearby Charlottenlund Palace. The station was among the first served by the S-train, as service began on the 3 of April 1934 when the line Frederiksberg-Vanløse-Hellerup-Klampenborg was opened.

See also
 List of railway stations in Denmark

References

External links

 Banedanmark
 DSB

S-train (Copenhagen) stations
Railway stations opened in 1863
Railway stations in Denmark opened in the 19th century